Outram Ghat is a ghat built during British Raj, along the river bank of Hooghly, a distributary of the Ganges River, and on its bank on Kolkata side.

It was built in late nineteenth century by British authorities in memory of Sir James Outram. During colonial era it used to be a key port and the main mooring for ships to East Bengal and Burma. The Outram ghat is located in the southern direction busy and bustling Babughat of Kolkata.

References

Monuments and memorials in Kolkata
19th century in Kolkata
Ghats in Kolkata